Ribaforada is a town and municipality located in the province and autonomous community of Navarre, northern Spain. Their football team is the Club Deportivo Ribaforada.

References

External links
 RIBAFORADA in the Bernardo Estornés Lasa - Auñamendi Encyclopedia (Euskomedia Fundazioa) 
 

Municipalities in Navarre